Unipolar may refer to:

Electronics
 Unipolar generator, a DC electrical generator
 Unipolar motor, a type of small DC electric motor
 Unipolar transistor, transistors that involve single-carrier-type operation

Science and medicine
 Unipolar depression or major depressive disorder
 Unipolar neuron, a neuron with a single neurite

Other uses
 Unipolar encoding, a line code
 Unipolarity, a distribution of power in international relations in which one state exercises most of the cultural, economic, and military influence